This is a list of Egyptian basketball players in foreign leagues.

Professional leagues

Austria

Magdy Abou-Ahmed-Redwell Gunners Oberwart -  Austrian Basketball League

Italy

Shadi Nafea - Frassati Ciampino - Serie C basketball

Poland

Mohamed Abelaal AZS AGH Krakow - 1Liga

South Korea

Assem Marei(206-92-F)- Changwon LG Sakers- Korean Basketball League

United States

Abdel Rahman Nader - Phoenix Suns-NBA

Depth chart

Youth leagues

Switzerland

 Amer Mahgoub Sofian- BBC Nyon- Swiss Basketball League

College basketball

United States

NCAA Men's Division I Basketball Championship

Omar El Sheikh  -Arkansas State Red Wolves men's basketball- Senior
Ismael Massoud-Kansas State Wildcats men's basketball- Junior
Essam Mostafa -Coastal Carolina Chanticleers men's basketball- Junior
Adam Afifi  -Cal State Northridge Matadors men's basketball- Junior
 Aly Khalifa -Charlotte 49ers men's basketball - Sophomore

NCAA Men's Division II Basketball Championship

Mohamed AlKadi  - Allen University - Junior
Adam Moussa -Black Hills State Yellow Jackets -Junior
Ali Ragab  - Gannon University- Sophomore

National Association of Intercollegiate Athletics

Mohamed El Gohary  - Life University  -Junior

Yassin Mohamed - University of Michigan–Dearborn -Sophomore 

Ibrahim Mohamed - University of Michigan–Dearborn -Freshman

National Junior College Athletic Association

NJCAA Division I

Yassen Hussein  - Lake Land College - Sophomore
 
Malek Abdel Gowad  - South Plains College - Sophomore

Ibrahim Zahran  - Frank Phillips College - Freshman

Mahmoud Walid  - Frank Phillips College - Freshman

Moaz Mohamed  - Cloud County Community College - Freshman

Depth chart

High school basketball

United States

Belal El Shakery -The Winchendon School -Winchendon, MA -Class 2023
Omar Abutaleb -MacDuffie School-Granby, MA -Class 2023
Abdulrahman Helwa -Combine Academy -Lincolnton, NC -Class 2023
Yassin Abdel Wahab - Spring Creek Academy -Plano, TX -Class 2023
Zein Wahdan  -Springfield Commonwealth Academy-Springfield, MA -Class 2023
Khalil Elbatrawy -Dickinson high School-Dickinson, TX -Class 2024
Seifeldin Hendawy- NBA Africa - Senegal - Class 2024 
Ahmed Nedal - Spring Creek Academy -Plano, TX -Class 2024
Anas Rezk -Springfield Commonwealth Academy-Springfield, MA -Class 2024
Adam Elhalawany- FIBA's Youth Development Program (YDP)- Class 2024

Canada

Asser Gouda - Edge School - Calgary, Alberta - Class 2023

Hussein Elmaraghy   -New Horizon Academy  - Burlington, Ontario - Class 2024

References

External links
Basketball.usbasket.com
Maxpreps.com
Cbssports.com
Sjnmahoops.com
Dbv-charlottenburg.de
Basketball Realgm

riograndesun.com
Asian Basketball Main Page - ASIA-BASKET

Ranked top 10 in the state?: Is Nour Farag a Top 10 Prospect?
Story Archive

Ανδρική Ομάδα - Ίκαρος Καλλιθέας

Lsts
Basketball in Egypt
basketball players
Egyptian